Statistics of Ekstraklasa for the 1929 season.

Overview
The championship was contested by 13 teams and Warta Poznań won the title.

League table

Results

References
Poland - List of final tables (RSSSF)

Ekstraklasa seasons
1
Pol
Pol